Shankaranarayana is a village in Kundapura taluk of Udupi district in the state of Karnataka in India.It is situated in midst of coconut and arecanut plantations along with forests adjoining western ghats. Earlier this village was called as Golikatte.

History

The history of Shankaranayana goes back to ancient times because the temple is said to be constructed on water ( or on a lake ) by ancient people. The previous name of the Village was Golikatte, Because of the Gods Shankara and Narayana, the village name has been changed to Shankaranarayana. Now Shanakaranarayana temple is the main landmark of the village along with Sri Veera kallukutika temple which has devotees from all around the district of shivamoga, North Kannada, Udupi, Mangalore, and even from North Karnataka.

Culture
The annual fair held every year on 16 January attracts large numbers of people from surrounding villages.  Shankara (Hara) and Narayana (Hari) are jointly worshipped here and there are five Shankaranarayana temples within a radius of about 15 kilometers.

Modern facilities
This small village has almost all facilities ideally required for an Indian village. Kinder Garden, Primary School, High school, College, Computer Institute are educational facilities. Government Hospital, Petrol Bunk. National Bank and Co-operative banks, clinics and dispensaries, Police Station, Sub Registrar Office office, Veterinary Hospital, Oil Mills are all there catering to the needs of Rural People. The place is well connected to Kundapura, Udupi (district centre), Shimoga (Neighboring District) and Kollur (important pilgrimage centre). This village may be dubbed as Pensioners' retreat!

Education facilities
Shankaranarayana has a primary school that is more than one hundred years old. Now the village also has an English Medium Primary school extended to high school and pre-university courses, First Grade College, Computer Education Centre, Typewriting School,

Business
As this is not a business center, the main business of villagers revolves around agriculture. Coconut, paddy, areca nut, pepper, cashew, and recently rubber are the main crops. Besides agriculture, people find their lively hood in the Hotel business, Petrol bunks, bars & restaurants, Ice cream factory and Parlor, Grocery Shops, and Home Industries are also located in the village

External links
 More information about the temple.

Villages in Udupi district